Scorpiopsis diplaneta is a moth in the family Depressariidae. It was described by Edward Meyrick in 1930. It is found in New Guinea.

The wingspan is 18–19 mm. The forewings are crimson, variably more or less suffused fuscous except on the margins of the markings, with numerous small pale yellow spots arranged in series. The extreme costal edge is white except towards the extremities and there is a round snow-white spot in the disc at two-thirds, and a smaller one obliquely beyond and above it. The hindwings are ochreous whitish, faintly or sometimes strongly suffused rose pink and the apex sometimes narrowly grey.

References

Moths described in 1930
Depressariinae